The many-eyed snake eel (Ophichthus polyophthalmus, also known as the large-spotted snake eel, the manyeyed worm eel, the ocellated worm eel, or the yellow-spotted snake eel) is a species of eel in the family Ophichthidae (worm/snake eels). It was described by Pieter Bleeker in 1864. It is a tropical, marine and freshwater-dwelling eel which is known from the Indo-Pacific, including East Africa and the Hawaiian Islands.

References

Ophichthus
Taxa named by Pieter Bleeker
Fish described in 1864